The Last Four on Santa Cruz is a 1936 German drama film directed by Werner Klingler and starring Hermann Speelmans, Irene von Meyendorff and Valéry Inkijinoff. The film was shot at the Babelsberg Studios in Berlin and on location in the Canary Islands.

Cast
 Hermann Speelmans as Kapitän Pieter Streuvels
 Irene von Meyendorff as Madeleine - seine Braut
 Valéry Inkijinoff as Reeder Alexis Aika
 Françoise Rosay as Nadja Danouw
 Erich Ponto as Alexander Ghazaroff
 Josef Sieber as Jack
 Max Schreck as William
 Beppo Brem as Erik
 Andrews Engelmann as Cairos
 Harald Gloth as Hein
 Walter Holten as Sklavenhalter Malherbes
 Ludwig Andersen as Dunard
 Max Harry Ernst as Ein Gast

References

Bibliography

External links 
 

1936 films
1936 drama films
German drama films
Films of Nazi Germany
1930s German-language films
Films directed by Werner Klingler
Films set in the Canary Islands
Films shot in the Canary Islands
Films set on islands
Seafaring films
UFA GmbH films
German black-and-white films
Films shot at Babelsberg Studios
1930s German films